In algebra, Zariski's finiteness theorem gives a positive answer to Hilbert's 14th problem for the polynomial ring in two variables, as a special case. Precisely, it states:
Given a normal domain A, finitely generated as an algebra over a field k, if L is a subfield of the field of fractions of A containing k such that , then the k-subalgebra  is finitely generated.

References 

Hilbert's problems
Invariant theory
Commutative algebra